Steers is a South African quick-service restaurant brand, serving burgers and chips. Other menu items include chicken burgers, ribs as well as ice cream, milkshakes and chicken & salads among other things.

History

The history of the company revolves around the Halamandaris family, whose family members are still part of the executive team today, with extensive experience in the food and franchising industries.

Steers founder, George Halamandress, created the original Milky Lane ice cream parlours, followed in quick succession by the first South African steakhouse (the Rosebank Golden Spur), the Seven Steers steakhouse in Highlands North and the Black Steer in Yeoville in the early 1960s. He was also one of the first entrepreneurs to bring the franchising concept to South Africa.

After Uncle George died in 1984, leadership of the chain passed to his nephews Peter, Theo, and their brother, Perry, as well as to Uncle George's youngest son, John. The three brothers had all been operating their own franchises and John was operating the manufacturing business, supplying Steers outlets and other retailers. Together, they re-engineered the brand and actively sought new franchisees. The early 1980s saw the opening of Steers in Sandton City, which attracted interest from would-be franchisees, and this encouraged the team behind Steers to launch their franchise programme.

There seemed to be no shortage of prospective franchisees wanting to buy into their franchise model, and more than 15 Steers outlets had opened within two years, with this number growing to 250 stores 10 years later.

By the end of the 1990s, Steers started expanding it's business beyond South Africa, and outlets opened in Swaziland (now Eswatini), Botswana, Zimbabwe, Kenya, Mauritius, Zambia, Tanzania and Ivory Coast. The name Steers evolved over the years too, starting with Golden Spur, then changing to Seven Steer, followed by Branded Steer and Longhorn Steer, before becoming Steers.

Steers Holdings listed on the Johannesburg Stock Exchange in November 1994, and in 2001 changed its name to Famous Brands Limited. This reflected the diversity of the Famous Brands group portfolio, although Steers remained the icon brand within the group.

The brand has continued to prosper and currently has over 600 Steers restaurants worldwide. By attracting new consumers as well as increasing the consumption frequency of existing customers, Steers succeeded in reaching their target of double-digit system-wide sales growth in 2012.

In the late 80s the Comitis family, who owned the Steers rights in the Western Cape, continued to grow the brand throughout Southern Africa. After decades of growth Steers became the most prominent fast food company in Southern Africa and the Comitis family sold the share equity back to the Famous Brands parent company.

Background

Franchise
In 1983, Steers launched a new franchise programmer. The owners placed a single advertisement in a local newspaper inviting franchisees to apply, and since then Steers has never had a shortage of prospective franchisees seeking to buy into the franchise. Within two years there were more than 15 outlets opened, and this number grew to 250 stores ten years later. By the end of the 90s Steers started expanding beyond South Africa’s borders, with outlets in Eswatini, Botswana, Namibia, Zimbabwe, Kenya, Mauritius, Zambia, Tanzania and Ivory Coast. There are over 500 franchises across Africa. A Steers restaurant opened on Lavender Hill, Battersea, London, UK in late July 2013. Although as of 2022, this has now been closed

Achievements
For 17 years in a row, Steers has been recognized by well-known Johannesburg listing magazine, Leisure Options, for serving the Best Hamburger in the QSR industry. Steers has also won ‘best chips’ for 13 years running. 

Steers Holdings Limited was, later renamed Famous Brands Limited.

Slogans
 Flame-Grilled, It Just Tastes Better (current)
 Real Burgers 
 Real Food Made Real Good

Countries with Steers restaurants

See also
 List of restaurants in South Africa

References

Fast-food hamburger restaurants
Fast-food franchises
Fast-food chains of South Africa
Restaurants in South Africa
Companies based in Johannesburg
South African brands